Gort is a town in Galway, Ireland.

Gort may also refer to:

 The Gort, County Tyrone, in the list of townlands of County Tyrone, Northern Ireland 
 Gort (letter), twelfth letter of the Ogham alphabet

Fiction
 Gort (The Day the Earth Stood Still), a fictional robot in the film
 Gort Pig, a fictional character in Garfield and Friends

People
 Viscount Gort, the title of two peerages in British and Irish history
 John Vereker, 6th Viscount Gort (1886–1946), (Lord Gort) a World War II British Expeditionary Force commander
 F. G. L. Chester (1899–1946), nicknamed "Gort", a member of Z Special Unit in World War II